Parshino is a rural locality (a village) in Shemogodskoye Rural Settlement, Velikoustyugsky District, Vologda Oblast, Russia. The population was 23 as of 2002.

Geography 
The distance to Veliky Ustyug is 30 km, to Aristovo is 14 km. Fedorovskoye is the nearest rural locality.

References 

Rural localities in Velikoustyugsky District